The National Flag Memorial (Spanish, Monumento Nacional a la Bandera) in Rosario, Argentina, is a monumental complex built near the shore of the Paraná River. It was inaugurated on June 20, 1957, the anniversary of the death of Manuel Belgrano, creator of the Argentine flag, who raised it for the first time on an island on the opposite shore of the river on February 27, 1812.

Description
The complex has a total area of about 10,000 square metres, and was built mostly using stone from the Andes, under the direction of architects Ángel Guido and Alejandro Bustillo, and the sculptors José Fioravanti, Alfredo Bigatti and Eduardo Barnes.

The Monumento has three parts: the Tower (Torre) or mast, 70 metres high, which commemorates the Revolution of May 1810 and houses Manuel Belgrano's crypt in its base; the Civic Courtyard (Patio Cívico), which symbolizes the effort of the organization of the state (the Courtyard is used for massive open-air shows), and the Triumphal Propylaeum (Propileo Triunfal), representing the Nation as organized after the 1853 Constitution. Under the Propylaeum there is the Honour Room for the Flags of America (where the flags of all American nations are displayed).

The complex faces Belgrano Avenue, and is delimited by Córdoba St. and Santa Fe St., which slope down towards the river at this point. The Propylaeum can be accessed from the pedestrian passage called Pasaje Juramento ("Oath Passage"), which starts at Buenos Aires St. between the municipal building (Palacio de los Leones) and the Cathedral, in front of Plaza 25 de Mayo (May 25th Square). The passage is flanked by statues by famous sculptor Lola Mora.

The Memorial and the National Flag Park located in front of it are the seat of the main celebrations of Flag Day on June 20. The 50th anniversary of the inauguration of the complex, in 2007, was marked by a special celebration and by the unveiling of a new lighting system.

Tourism 
According to the Travelers Choice Awards 2013, granted by the Tripavisor site based on the votes of the people, the National Monument to La Bandera ranks number 20 among the 25 places of interest to visit in South America.

See also
Flag of Argentina
Manuel Belgrano
List of buildings
List of National Historic Monuments of Argentina

References

External links

 Virtual Visit to the Flag memorial
 View map location
 
 Works and sites of patrimonial value of the municipality of Rosario

Monuments and memorials in Argentina
National Historic Monuments of Argentina
Government buildings completed in 1957
Buildings and structures in Rosario, Santa Fe
Manuel Belgrano
Tourist attractions in Rosario, Santa Fe
Heraldic sites